Radivoje Ognjanović (1 July 1933 – 30 August 2011) was a Yugoslav and Serbian football manager and player.

Club career
After briefly playing for Partizan, Ognjanović made a name for himself at Radnički Beograd, totaling 153 appearances and scoring 61 goals for the club in the Yugoslav First League between 1953 and 1961.

Ognjanović joined Basel's first team for their 1964–65 season under head coach Jiří Sobotka. After playing in one test game Ognjanović played his domestic league debut for his new club in the home game in the Landhof on 13 December 1964 as Basel were defeated 2–3 by Servette. He scored his first goal for the club, just three days later, on 16 December, in the away game in the Olympique de la Pontaise as Basel won 2–1 against Lausanne-Sport.

He played just this one season with the club and during this time Ognjanović played a total of 22 games for Basel scoring a total of 8 goals. 15 of these games were in the Nationalliga A, 2 in the Swiss Cup and 5 were friendly games. He scored 6 goals in the domestic league and the other 2 were scored during the test games.

Ognjanović moved on and played one season for Grenchen and one more for Moutier and then he retired from active football.

International career
At international level, Ognjanović was capped five times for Yugoslavia between 1957 and 1959, scoring once. He was a member of the team at the 1958 FIFA World Cup.

Managerial career
After hanging up his boots, Ognjanović served as manager of several clubs and national teams, most notably Cameroon and Ivory Coast.

Personal life
Ognjanović died on 30 August 2011, at the age of 78.

Honours
Partizan
 Yugoslav First League: 1961–62
 Yugoslav Cup: 1952

Cameroon
 African Cup of Nations: 1984

References

Sources
 Die ersten 125 Jahre. Publisher: Josef Zindel im Friedrich Reinhardt Verlag, Basel. 
 Verein "Basler Fussballarchiv" Homepage

External links
 
 
 

1933 births
2011 deaths
Sportspeople from Sremska Mitrovica
Yugoslav footballers
Serbian footballers
Association football forwards
Yugoslavia international footballers
1958 FIFA World Cup players
FK Partizan players
FK Radnički Beograd players
Red Star Belgrade footballers
SK Sturm Graz players
FC Basel players
FC Grenchen players
Yugoslav First League players
Swiss Super League players
Yugoslav expatriate footballers
Expatriate footballers in Austria
Expatriate footballers in Switzerland
Yugoslav expatriate sportspeople in Austria
Yugoslav expatriate sportspeople in Switzerland
Yugoslav expatriate sportspeople in Cameroon
Yugoslav football managers
Serbia and Montenegro football managers
Serbian football managers
FK Vrbas managers
Cameroon national football team managers
Ivory Coast national football team managers
1984 African Cup of Nations managers
1990 African Cup of Nations managers
Yugoslav expatriate football managers
Serbia and Montenegro expatriate football managers
Expatriate football managers in Cameroon
Expatriate football managers in Ivory Coast
Expatriate football managers in China
Serbia and Montenegro expatriate sportspeople in China